The Family: The Real Story of the Bush Dynasty is an unauthorized biography of the Bush family by the American investigative journalist Kitty Kelley. It was published on September 14, 2004, less than two months before the 2004 US Presidential election. Reviews of the book were mixed, with some of the "accusations," according to The New York Times, "[standing] up better than others."

Glynn Wilson, who failed to graduate yet falsely claimed to be professor of journalism at the University of Tennessee and who, in the aftermath of Hurricane Katrina, falsely claimed to have been the New Orleans Bureau Chief of the Dallas Morning News  (no such bureau existed), was a free-lance journalist from Alabama, who sued Kelley for plagiarism claiming passages from the book contained the exact wording as an online article he had written. Wilson subsequently withdrew the infringement suit, first filed in Federal District Court in Birmingham. In an interview with the New York Times, Wilson indicated he withdrew because he was likely to lose the suit. Wilson also agreed not to refile his claim. According to the New York Times, Wilson received no monetary settlement from Ms. Kelley or the publisher.

References

External links
Official website
New York Times Book Review, "The Family: 'Here Comes the Son'"
 "All the Way to the White House" review in The Washington Post
"Brought low by a bottom feeder" review in The Guardian
 Amazon.com's book reviews and description 
 Barnes & Noble's editorial reviews and overview 
 OnTheIssues.org's book review and excerpts
 Presentation by Kelley on The Family, September 16, 2004, C-SPAN
 Book party for The Family, September 21, 2004, C-SPAN
 Writer gives up legal challenge to Bush Book, September 21, 2004, March 19, 2005 The New York Times

2004 non-fiction books
Books about politics of the United States
Books about George W. Bush
Books about George H. W. Bush
Books involved in plagiarism controversies
Works about the Bush family
Unauthorized biographies